The 1933 Colorado Agricultural Aggies football team represented Colorado Agricultural College (now known as Colorado State University) in the Rocky Mountain Conference (RMC) during the 1933 college football season.  In their 23rd season under head coach Harry W. Hughes, the Aggies compiled a 5–1–1 record, tied for the RMC championship, and outscored all opponents by a total of 78 to 26.

Four Colorado Agricultural players received all-conference honors in 1933: end Glenn Morris, halfback Wilbur (Red) White, halfback Ralph Maag, and quarterback Bud Dammann.

Schedule

References

Colorado Agricultural
Colorado State Rams football seasons
Rocky Mountain Athletic Conference football champion seasons
Colorado Agricultural Aggies football